Đorđe Rajković (Novi Sad, Austrian Empire, 1825 - Novi Sad, Kingdom of Serbia, 28 July 1886) was a Serbian writer, teacher, and editor of numerous journals and periodicals. He collected and preserved old archives and manuscripts. He collaborated with Vuk Karadžić on epic poems he collected throughout Slavonia among the Serbian population. He was a member of Matica Srpska.

Biography 
In 1844, at the age of nineteen, he had his first poem Jed I med published, followed by Pesme. All the documents published by Đorđe Rajković, particularly the ones he discovered in the archives of Upper Karlovci eparchy and in the bishop's archives at Plaški, tie in with the broader endeavors of the Metropolitanate of Karlovci and all our Serbian church councils to define legally the Serbian people in the 18th century Habsburg monarchy. The position according to Serbian and official Austrian interpretation was based on the records found in the archives.

Works
 Izabrani spisi: biografije književnika, Volume 1
 Faksimile od rukopisa znameniti Srba: Skupio, Volume 1
 Srpske narodne pesme iz Slavonije

References 

1825 births
1886 deaths
Writers from Novi Sad
Serbian male writers
Serbian male poets
Serbian journalists